The Klang Valley is served by the Klang Valley Integrated Transit System, consisting of various rail transit services. Thousands of people use these train services each day. The following are lists of train stations in the Klang Valley which is sorted according to alphabetical order and also according to their routes.

Station list in alphabetical order

Station list according to lines
[
  {
    "type": "ExternalData",
    "service": "geoshape",
    "ids": "Q1865",
    "properties": {
      "stroke": "#000000",
      "fill-opacity": 0.2,
      "stroke-width": 5
    }
  },
{
  "type": "ExternalData",
  "service": "geoline",
  "ids": "Q4207166",
  "properties": {
    "stroke": "#1964b7",
    "stroke-width": 6
  }
  },

{
  "type": "ExternalData",
  "service": "geoline",
  "ids": "Q4873303",
  "properties": {
    "stroke": "#dc241f",
    "stroke-width": 6
  }
  },

{
  "type": "ExternalData",
  "service": "geoline",
  "ids": "Q474391",
  "properties": {
    "stroke": "#721422",
    "stroke-width": 6
  }
  },

{
  "type": "ExternalData",
  "service": "geoline",
  "ids": "Q248445",
  "properties": {
    "stroke": "#e0115f",
    "stroke-width": 6
  }
  },

{
  "type": "ExternalData",
  "service": "geoline",
  "ids": "Q1431592",
  "properties": {
    "stroke": "#800080",
    "stroke-width": 6
  }
  },

{
  "type": "ExternalData",
  "service": "geoline",
  "ids": "Q1790833",
  "properties": {
    "stroke": "#7dba00",
    "stroke-width": 6
  }
},

{
    "type": "ExternalData",
    "service": "geoline",
    "ids": "Q6717618",
    "properties": {
      "stroke": "#008000",
      "stroke-width": 6
    }
  },

{
  "type": "ExternalData",
  "service": "geoline",
  "ids": "Q51419215",
  "properties": {
    "stroke": "#8d5b2d",
    "stroke-width": 6
  }
  },

{
  "type": "ExternalData",
  "service": "geoline",
  "ids": "Q16255640",
  "properties": {
    "stroke": "#1e4d2b",
    "stroke-width": 6
  }
  },

{
  "type": "ExternalData",
  "service": "geoline",
  "ids": "Q17055821",
  "properties": {
    "stroke": "#00aae4",
    "stroke-width": 6
  }
  },

{
    "type": "ExternalData",
    "service": "geoline",
    "ids": "Q17053935",
    "properties": {
      "stroke": "#ffcc00",
      "stroke-width": 6
  }
  },
]

Legend
 Interchange station (paid link)

 Connecting station (unpaid link)

 Connected with airport

 Connected with intercity rail service

 Connected with long-distance bus terminal

Rail line denoted in Italics - Under construction

Station name denoted in Italics - Provisioned/future station

Commuter rail lines
These two lines begin separately, but share a common route between Putra and KL Sentral stations, before splitting again and heading towards their respective termini. This effectively makes Putra, Bank Negara, Kuala Lumpur and KL Sentral stations interchanges between the two lines. The station codes are given based on the portion of the lines the stations are on. (Station codes legend: K-Komuter, A-Tanjung Malim route, B-Pulau Sebang/Tampin route, C-Batu Caves route, D-Port Klang route)

Light rapid transit (LRT) lines
The  line was proposed during 2015 and is still under construction.

The Ampang and Sri Petaling Lines operate under a single LRT system. They share a common route from Sentul Timur station to Chan Sow Lin station, therefore, all stations on this route act as interchange stations between both the lines. After the Chan Sow Lin station, the lines split toward their respective termini. The Kelana Jaya Line starts in Gombak in the north, passing through the city centre, and terminating at Putra Heights station which is also the southern terminus of the Sri Petaling Line, serving as an interchange between the two lines.

The third LRT system, the Bandar Utama-Klang Line (also known as the ) is planned to be opened in 2024. It will be the first rail transit line in the Klang Valley Integrated Transit System to be situated completely outside the borders of Kuala Lumpur.

Bus rapid transit (BRT) Lines
The  is a bus rapid transit line in Bandar Sunway, Selangor. The BRT line is a public-private partnership project between Prasarana Malaysia and Sunway Group to provide a better and integrated transit service for the residents and commuters of Bandar Sunway and USJ.

Airport rail link lines
There are two main airport rail link systems. One is operated by Express Rail Link (ERL) and another one by Keretapi Tanah Melayu (KTM).

The KLIA Ekspres is a non-stop service between KL Sentral and the Kuala Lumpur International Airport (KLIA), and does not stop at any station in between (hence the name "express"). The KLIA Transit services all stations between KL Sentral and KLIA (hence the name "transit").

The , operated by KTM as part of its KTM Komuter service, serves the Sultan Abdul Aziz Shah Airport (also known as Subang Airport), spanning 26 km from KL Sentral to Terminal Skypark station.

Monorail lines

The  is situated entirely within the Kuala Lumpur city centre and serves to connect various shopping and entertainment centres throughout the city centre.

The  is a proposed transit line that was meant to serve the administrative capital of Putrajaya. The line's construction began in 2004 but was halted due to the city's low population. In 2020, plans to resume the construction are underway.

Mass rapid transit (MRT) lines
The Kajang Line is currently operational. The Putrajaya Line is partially operational as of June 2022 while the rest of Putrajaya Line (Phrase II) will be opened on 16 March 2023.

The proposed  is currently undergoing pre-construction phase, with constructions of the loop line set to commence in 2023.

Klang Valley Integrated Transit Map 
The Klang Valley Integrated Transit Map, released by Rapid KL illustrates the connectivity between the different lines through interchanges and connecting stations. The map consists of all operational lines in the Klang Valley Integrated Transit system, as well as the remainder of the Putrajaya Line and the upcoming Shah Alam Line. The map also features stations with parking facilities.

The transit map does not include the proposed Circle Line and Putrajaya Monorail.

Latest version:

Notes

References 

Klang Valley
Klang Valley train stations
Railway stations in Malaysia
Rail